Pavel Křížkovský (born as Karel Křížkovský) (9 January 1820, Kreuzendorf – 8 May 1885, Brno) was a Czech choral composer and conductor.

Life
Křížkovský was born in Kreuzendorf, Austrian Silesia. He was a chorister in a monastery in Opava when young, and studied at the Faculty of Philosophy of University of Olomouc and later in Brno. The palace, in which Křižkovský lived from 1878 to 1883, is now used as the Palacký University of Olomouc Rectory. He became an Augustinian friar in 1845, entering the St. Thomas's Abbey, and was named choirmaster there in 1848. He founded two choral societies in Brno, and gave choral and chamber music concerts there regularly. Among his choral students was Leoš Janáček. Křížkovský was a dedicated Slavic culturalist, and often gave performances of lesser-known Moravian and Czech composers before withdrawing from secular musicianship in the 1870s as a result of the Cecilian movement. Following this he became choir director at a cathedral in Olomouc, and retired in 1877. He died in Brno.

Most of Křížkovský's compositional output consists of choral settings of folk songs and sacred vocal music. His best known work is the cantata Sts. Cyril and Methodius.

References
 Encyklopedie dějin města Brna

1820 births
1885 deaths
People from Opava District
Czech male classical composers
Czech Romantic composers
Augustinian friars
Czech Roman Catholics
19th-century Czech people
Czech conductors (music)
Male conductors (music)
Palacký University Olomouc alumni
19th-century classical composers
19th-century conductors (music)
Choral composers